Ruben Houkes (born 8 June 1979 in Schagen, North Holland) is a Dutch judoka.

Houkes won gold in the men's under 60-kilo class at the 2007 World Judo Championships.

He won the bronze medal at the 2008 Beijing Olympics in the Men's 60 kg class.

Achievements

References

External links
 
 Videos of Ruben Houkes (judovision.org)

1979 births
Living people
Dutch male judoka
Judoka at the 2008 Summer Olympics
Medalists at the 2008 Summer Olympics
Olympic judoka of the Netherlands
Olympic bronze medalists for the Netherlands
Olympic medalists in judo
People from Schagen
World judo champions
Sportspeople from North Holland
20th-century Dutch people
21st-century Dutch people